Ana María Olivera Pessano (born 17 December 1953 in Montevideo, Uruguay) is an Uruguayan professor and politician belonging to the Communist Party – Broad Front. Since February 15, 2020 she serves as National Representative for Montevideo. Previously, she held the position of Deputy Minister of Social Development and Intendant of Montevideo, being the first woman to be elected to that position. Her mandate as Intendant ran from July 8, 2010, to July 9, 2015, when she was succeeded by Daniel Martínez.

Biography

Early life 
She was born in Montevideo on December 17, 1953. At a very young age she joined the MLN-Tupamaros, so she had to go into exile in Cuba and later in France during the civic-military dictatorship. In France, he joined the Communist Party of Uruguay. Once the dictatorship ended, she returned to her native country and graduated as a secondary school French teacher.

Political career 

In 1995 she was appointed Director of the Division of Local Administrations of the Municipality of Montevideo, by the then Intendant, Mariano Arana. In a new term of office of Arana, Olivera assumes the position of Director of the Western Region Division, until 2003. Again, in 2003 and until 2005 she assumes as General Director of the Decentralization Department, being in charge of the sectoral commissions of Youth, Children, Women, the Elderly and Social Management for the Disabled. In March 2005, after President Tabaré Vázquez took office, she was appointed Deputy Minister of Social Development. Back then, the officerholder was Marina Arismendi.

After José Mujica took office, he appointed her as Minister of Social Development. However, Olivera rejected the position when she was proclaimed as candidate by the Broad Front in Montevideo for the 2015 municipal election.

See also 

 Politics of Uruguay

References

External links
 Ana Olivera - Currículum - MIDES

1953 births
Living people
Intendants of Montevideo
Members of the Chamber of Representatives of Uruguay
Women mayors of places in Uruguay
People from Montevideo
Communist Party of Uruguay politicians
Broad Front (Uruguay) politicians